The Grande Aiguille is a mountain of the Swiss Pennine Alps, situated near Bourg Saint Pierre in the canton of Valais. With an elevation of 3,682 metres above sea level, it the culminating point of the ridge named Les Maisons Blanches that lies west of the Corbassière Glacier, in the Grand Combin massif.

References

External links
 Grande Aiguille on Hikr

Mountains of the Alps
Alpine three-thousanders
Mountains of Switzerland
Mountains of Valais